"Chief Rocka" is the third single released from the Lords of the Underground's debut album, Here Come the Lords. The song was produced and featured scratches by K-Def, with K-Def and Marley Marl mixing it. "Chief Rocka" became the group's most successful single and has become their signature song. It peaked at #55 on the Billboard Hot 100, the group's highest appearance on that chart, and went to #1 on the Hot Rap Singles. The line "I live for the funk, I die for the funk" was sampled for the hook of The Notorious B.I.G. song "Machine Gun Funk" from his 1994 classic Ready to Die.
The chorus was also interpolated in Kanye West's "Guilt Trip" on his 2013 Yeezus.

Single track listing

A-Side
"Chief Rocka" (Rumblin' Mix)- 4:07
"Chief Rocka" (Instrumental)- 4:07
"Chief Rocka" (Beat-A-Pella)- 4:04

B-Side
"Chief Rocka" (Jazzy Underground Mix)- 4:04
"Chief Rocka" (Video Version)- 4:07
"Chief Rocka" (Mixshow DJ Mix)- 4:04

Charts

1992 songs
1993 singles
Lords of the Underground songs
Elektra Records singles